= Dhangdev Saiyidan =

- Town
- Location within Pakistan
- Coordinates: 33.16°N 73.24°E
- Country: Pakistan
- Province: Islamabad C.T
- Elevation: 438 m (1,437 ft)
- Time zone: UTC+5 (PST)

Dhangdev Saiyidan is a town in the Islamabad Capital Territory of Pakistan. It is located at 33° 16' N 73° 24' E with an altitude of 438 metres (1440 feet).
